Nolberto Albino "Ñol" Solano Todco (born 12 December 1974), commonly known as Nobby Solano, is a retired Peruvian professional footballer who played as a midfielder. He is currently the assistant manager of the Peru national football team, as well as the manager of the Peru Olympic football team.

His talents in football range from accurate crosses to accomplished dead-ball skills and he traditionally played either on the right side of midfield, or as a right back during his career. Solano spent much of his career in the Premier League, where he is generally associated with Newcastle United. He became the first Peruvian to play in the Premier League, and appear in the FA Cup Final. He is considered a cult hero at the Tyneside club, and was also noted for his trumpet playing and formed his own salsa band named The Geordie Latinos. He has described himself as an "adopted Geordie."

Solano is a popular figure in his native Peru, where he is seen as one of the most famous Peruvians, appearing on telephone cards and having his wedding televised live. He played 95 times for the national team between 1994 and 2009.

Towards the end of his career, he went into coaching, and was first team coach at non-league side Newcastle Benfield, while contracted to Hartlepool United. He had short spells at Universitario and José Gálvez, and was manager of Internacional de Toronto for a few matches, before the club had its licensing agreement terminated. Since 2015, Solano has been involved within the national team setup, where he is assistant manager to Ricardo Gareca, and is the manager of the Olympic football team.

Early life
Born in Callao, Peru, Solano was the youngest of seven. His father, Albino, was in the Peru Navy, whilst his mother was a housewife who raised him, his four brothers and two sisters. He began playing football at a very early age in the streets of Callao.

Solano witnessed the Peru national football team qualify for the 1978 FIFA World Cup at the age of three and again qualify for the 1982 FIFA World Cup at the age of seven. The second World Cup he witnessed had the biggest effect on him. At that time he played a lot of football and his national team inspired him.

Club career

Early career

Solano signed his first professional contract with the Peruvian Primera División side Sporting Cristal in 1992 at the age of 17. He made his league debut on 13 April 1992 in his team's 2–0 win against San Agustín. Towards the end of his first season at Sporting Cristal, he signed a one-year contract with Deportivo Municipal, before returning to Cristal at the end of 1993. He was part of the Sporting Cristal squad of the 1990s during which the club won the Peru Primera División Championships (1994, 1995 and 1996) and reached the finals of the 1997 Copa Libertadores. Along with Roberto Palacios, Flavio Maestri, Julinho and Jorge Soto, he was one of Sporting Cristal's most recognized players of the era.

Boca Juniors
In 1997 aged 22 he signed for Argentinian side Boca Juniors where he became a teammate of Diego Maradona, who nicknamed Solano the 'Maestrito'. Solano said in 2004 that he would like to play for Boca Juniors again, but admitted he was perhaps too old for the ambition to be realized.

Newcastle United

In 1998, Solano became the first professional Peruvian footballer to play in England when he signed a contract with Newcastle United for £2,480,000. Interest in his first appearance for Newcastle reserves was so substantial that the kick off was delayed to accommodate the large crowd, many of whom had been delayed after a lorry had shed its load blocking one of the major routes into the city. Solano marked the occasion with a goal. His first team debut for Newcastle came in a Premier League match against Chelsea on 22 August 1998, when he came on after 67 minutes as a substitute for goalscorer Andreas Andersson. In June 2001, he signed a new five-year contract with the club. A month later he scored what he later described as "the best goal of [his] career" with a solo effort against 1860 München. During this first spell at Newcastle, he played in the 1999 FA Cup Final.

Aston Villa
Solano joined Aston Villa in January 2004 for a fee of £1.5 million and signed a two-and-a-half-year contract with the club. He attributed his leaving Newcastle to a "strained relationship" with manager Bobby Robson. He made his debut in a 5–0 win over Leicester City on 31 January, ended the 2004–05 season as top scorer, and was elected the club's Player of the Year by the supporters, his teammates, and the local press.

In what was Solano's last appearance for Villa, in August 2005, he was sent off for striking Portsmouth's Richard Hughes in the face. On transfer deadline day, Solano rejected a late offer to join Liverpool and agreed to return to Newcastle.

Return to Newcastle United
Solano returned to Newcastle United in August 2005 for a fee believed by the BBC to be £1.5 million. He signed a contract originally for two years, but with the option for Newcastle to extend it for another year. Midfielder James Milner went in the other direction, joining Aston Villa on a season-long loan. Solano revealed that Alan Shearer had played an influential role in arranging his return.

In the 2006–07 season, injuries to right-back Stephen Carr and others caused manager Glenn Roeder to play Solano at right-back instead of his usual right-wing position. However it was not an unfamiliar playing position to Solano, as he had started his football career in defence and had featured at right-back for his country. With his contract due to expire at the end of the season, Solano said he would be "crazy" to move on at the age of 32, and duly signed a new one-year contract. However a few months later, he asked to leave the club to be closer to his family, who had moved to London. His one regret was that he had been unable to help the club win a trophy for the fans.

West Ham United

Solano signed a one-year contract with West Ham United in August 2007. He made his debut for West Ham in October 2007, coming on as a second-half substitute in the 3–1 home win against Sunderland, and was instrumental in West Ham's second goal, his shot being deflected into the Sunderland goal by goalkeeper, Craig Gordon. His first goal for West Ham was a free-kick and the fifth goal in West Ham's 5–0 away win against Derby County on 10 November 2007. In the last game of the season on 11 May 2008 Solano scored his second free-kick goal, against Aston Villa, the match ended 2–2. He was released by West Ham when his contract expired at the end of the 2007–08 season having scored four goals in 23 appearances.

Larissa and Universitario
Although Solano was rumoured to be interesting LA Galaxy, he became "one of the biggest signings in the club’s history" when he signed for Super League Greece club AE Larissa in August 2008.

He then returned to Peru with Universitario de Deportes, for whom he scored a crucial penalty against Alianza Lima in the play-off for the Peruvian Primera División title, helping the team to a 2–0 aggregate victory to seal the club's 25th league title.

Leicester City

Solano returned to England, where he trained with Colchester United and with Newcastle, before, on 22 January 2010, signing for Leicester City until the end of the season. He was reunited with Nigel Pearson, who had been assistant manager at Newcastle. He made his debut as an 84th-minute substitute in a goalless draw against Newcastle at the Walkers Stadium on 30 January, to an enthusiastic reception from both sets of fans. He played his first full game in a 1–0 win over Crystal Palace on 16 March. Solano played eleven league games, scoring in a 4–3 penalty shootout defeat to Cardiff City in the Championship play-off semi-final second leg. He was offered a contract for a further six months, but chose to leave the club, preferring to follow Pearson to Hull City.

Hull City
Solano rejoined former Foxes' boss Nigel Pearson, who had recently taken over the manager's job at Hull City, signing a one-year deal. Despite initial expectations that Solano would be with Hull City for only a single season before retiring, Solano revealed in April 2011, that he hoped that he would be able to extend his stay with the Tigers beyond the 2010–11 season, by combining a playing and coaching role, as Nick Barmby had done.

Hartlepool United
It was announced on 13 May 2011 that Solano had signed for Hartlepool United, having previously worked with their manager Mick Wadsworth at Newcastle. Solano, on the first day of signing, promoted the idea of Are You Coming To Pools? with Hartlepool United selling season tickets for £100, the lowest price in Football League One.

On 2 August, Solano scored in a friendly against Sunderland, rivals of his former club Newcastle United, and scored his first league goal for Hartlepool on 17 September at home against Bury. The following week, Solano doubled his Hartlepool tally by scoring their first goal direct from a free-kick in the 2–1 away win at AFC Bournemouth. Following Wadsworth's sacking, his successor, first-team coach Neale Cooper, confirmed that Solano was not part of his plans, because he needed "players who will really graft, [and] that's not Nobby's game". In April 2012, the club confirmed Solano had been advised not to play for the remainder of the season because of recurring illness.

In February 2012, he became first-team coach at Northern League side Newcastle Benfield while remaining a member of Hartlepool's playing squad.

International career
Solano made his full international debut for Peru at the age of 18, and went on to be capped 95 times, scoring 20 goals. He has been a key member of the squad since the mid-1990s but, in June 2005, Solano decided to quit the Peru national football team due to disagreements with the coach, Freddy Ternero. In 2006, he returned to the national team setup under new coach Franco Navarro. Despite his return to the national team, Solano was not selected for Peru's Copa America 2007 squad. He continued to represent the national team thereafter, but with his country having no chance at all of qualifying for the 2010 FIFA World Cup, he announced his decision to retire from international football after World Cup Qualifiers against Argentina and Bolivia. Solano has also stated his desire to try and guide his country to the World Cup as a coach in the near future to try to make up for never making it as a player.

Managerial career
Solano took the first step into coaching as the part-time first-team coach of Newcastle Benfield in 2012.

In June 2012, he was confirmed as manager of Peruvian Primera División club Universitario de Deportes. On 12 December, Universitario confirmed that Solano had left the club, despite the fact he guided the club into the top half of the table after being in the relegation zone when he first took charge.

In 2014, he became the head coach of Canadian club Internacional de Toronto in League1 Ontario. However, on 22 July, the club had its licensing agreement terminated due to issues regarding the payment of player salaries, ending his tenure.

, Solano is a technical assistant to Ricardo Gareca with the Peru national team, and taking charge as coach of the U-23 team.

Personal life

Career statistics

Club

Managerial statistics

Honours

Club

Sporting Cristal
Peruvian First Division: 1994, 1995, 1996
Copa Libertadores Runner-up: 1997

Newcastle United
 UEFA Intertoto Cup: 2006

Universitario de Deportes
Peruvian First Division: 2009

International
Peru
 Kirin Cup: 1999, 2005

Individual
 Peruvian Player of the Year: 1992
 America's Ideal Team of the Year: 1997
 South American Player of the Year: 1997 (2nd place)
 Most assists in the Premier League: 1999–2000 (shared)

References

External links

Player site

International statistics at rsssf

1974 births
Living people
Sportspeople from Callao
Association football wingers
Peruvian footballers
Peru international footballers
Sporting Cristal footballers
Deportivo Municipal footballers
Boca Juniors footballers
Newcastle United F.C. players
Aston Villa F.C. players
West Ham United F.C. players
Athlitiki Enosi Larissa F.C. players
Club Universitario de Deportes footballers
Leicester City F.C. players
Hull City A.F.C. players
Hartlepool United F.C. players
Peruvian Primera División players
Argentine Primera División players
Premier League players
English Football League players
Super League Greece players
Peruvian expatriate footballers
Expatriate footballers in Argentina
Expatriate footballers in England
Expatriate footballers in Greece
Peruvian expatriate sportspeople in England
Peruvian expatriate sportspeople in Greece
1995 Copa América players
1999 Copa América players
2000 CONCACAF Gold Cup players
2004 Copa América players
Peruvian trumpeters
Peruvian football managers
Peruvian Primera División managers
Club Universitario de Deportes managers
José Gálvez FBC managers
21st-century trumpeters
FA Cup Final players